The 2004 CONCACAF Women's Pre-Olympic Tournament qualification determined the five teams that joined Canada, Costa Rica and the United States at the 2004 CONCACAF Women's Pre-Olympic Tournament in Costa Rica.

Teams
Originally, 17 teams entered the competition. Canada and the United States automatically qualified for the final tournament, along with hosts Costa Rica. Dominica later withdrew, and were replaced by Suriname. Following the qualifying draw, Puerto Rico and the U.S. Virgin Islands also withdrew.

Teams in bold qualified for the final tournament.

Caribbean Zone

Series A
Both matches were played in Paramaribo, Suriname. The Dominican Republic were originally drawn into the group, but were later moved to Group 3.

Trinidad and Tobago won 6–2 on aggregate and qualified for the 2004 CONCACAF Women's Pre-Olympic Tournament.

Series B
Both matches were played in George Town, Cayman Islands. The U.S. Virgin Islands were originally drawn into the group, but later withdrew.

Jamaica won 4–0 on aggregate and qualified for the 2004 CONCACAF Women's Pre-Olympic Tournament.

Series C
Both matches were played in San Cristóbal, Dominican Republic. Puerto Rico were originally drawn into the group, but later withdrew and were replaced by the Dominican Republic (who were moved from Group 1).

Haiti won 10–2 on aggregate and qualified for the 2004 CONCACAF Women's Pre-Olympic Tournament.

North/Central American Zone

Series D
All matches were played in Tegucigalpa, Honduras. Costa Rica were originally drawn into the group and selected to host the matches, but later were removed after replacing Mexico as the final tournament host. Mexico subsequently replaced Costa Rica in the group.

Series E
All matches were played in Guatemala City, Guatemala.

Goalscorers

References

Qual
2003 in women's association football